Brian Stokes Mitchell (born October 31, 1957) is an American actor and singer. A powerful baritone, he has been one of the central leading men of the Broadway theater since the 1990s. He won the Tony Award for Best Actor in a Musical in 2000 for his performance in Kiss Me, Kate.

Early life
Mitchell was born in Seattle, Washington, the youngest of four children of George Mitchell, an electronics engineer, and his wife Lillian (née Stokes), a school administrator. Mitchell grew up at various U.S. military bases overseas, where his father was a civilian engineer for the U.S. Navy. As a young boy, he lived in San Diego, California, where he began acting in school musicals. He did not attend college, having begun performing professionally while a student at Patrick Henry High School, although he did have private teachers in both acting and voice in his teen years. He has said that he studied film scoring, orchestration, and conducting through UCLA. Prior to Ragtime, he was known professionally as Brian Mitchell.

Career

Stage
Mitchell first performed on Broadway in the musical Mail in 1988, with music by Michael Rupert and lyrics by Jerry Cocker, winning the Theatre World award. His Broadway credits include an all-black revival of George and Ira Gershwin's Oh, Kay! (1990), Jelly's Last Jam (1992) based on the works of jazz artist Jelly Roll Morton, and Kander and Ebb's Kiss of the Spider Woman (1993).

He originated the role of Coalhouse Walker Jr, in the musical Ragtime, which opened on Broadway in January 1998. He received a 1998 Tony Award nomination for Best Actor in a Musical. He appeared in the 1999 revival of Cole Porter's Kiss Me, Kate as Fred Graham / Petruchio, winning the Tony Award for Best Actor in a Musical. He appeared on Broadway in King Hedley II in 2001 (Tony Award nomination) and Man of La Mancha in 2002 (Tony Award nomination).

He appeared in the New York City Center Encores! staged concert productions of Jule Styne's Do Re Mi (1999), Bob Merrill's Carnival! (2002), Kismet (2006), and The Band Wagon in 2014.

He played the title role in the 2002 Kennedy Center production of Sweeney Todd, part of the Stephen Sondheim celebration.

On June 9, 2005, Mitchell appeared in a concert version of the Rodgers and Hammerstein musical South Pacific at Carnegie Hall. He starred as Emile, alongside Reba McEntire as Nellie Forbush and Alec Baldwin as Luther Billis. The production was taped and telecast by PBS in 2006. Of his performance, Ben Brantley wrote in The New York Times, "As for Mr. Mitchell, his place in the pantheon of romantic musical leads is now guaranteed."

Playbill Records released his debut solo CD, Brian Stokes Mitchell on June 6, 2006. Mitchell has also performed in a Christmas concert with the Mormon Tabernacle Choir later released as a CD and DVD entitled Ring Christmas Bells.  His second solo CD, Simply Broadway, was released October 30, 2012, by CD Baby.

Mitchell returned to Broadway to star with Patti LuPone in the musical version of the Pedro Almodóvar film Women on the Verge of a Nervous Breakdown, which opened at the Belasco Theatre in November 2010.

A new musical titled Shuffle Along, or, the Making of the Musical Sensation of 1921 and All That Followed, based on the making of Shuffle Along opened on Broadway on March 14, 2016 in previews, officially on April 21 at the Music Box Theatre. Mitchell played "F.E. Miller", with Audra McDonald as "Lottie Gee", Billy Porter, Joshua Henry and Brandon Victor Dixon.

Television and film
Mitchell has a number of television and film credits, including the role of John Dolan in Roots: The Next Generations (1979), and a seven-year stint as Dr. Justin 'Jackpot' Jackson on Trapper John, M.D. from 1979 to 1986.  Mitchell made several appearances as a celebrity panelist on episodes of $25,000 Pyramid and $100,000 Pyramid in the 1980s, and was considered one of the game's better celebrity players, helping a contestant win the $100,000 grand prize on the latter show in February 1986.  Mitchell also participated as a celebrity panelist in four weeks' worth of episodes of The Match Game-Hollywood Squares Hour, a short-lived NBC game show that ran from 1983-1984. He played recurring roles as Hilary Banks' news anchor fiancé Trevor Newsworthy/Collins on The Fresh Prince of Bel-Air and on Frasier as Dr. Frasier Crane's upstairs neighbor and nemesis Cam Winston.  He supplied the singing voice of Jethro in the animated feature The Prince of Egypt (1998).  He guest starred in March 2010 in Ugly Betty as Wilhelmina Slater's ex-boyfriend, Don.

He appeared on the 57th episode of Glee, titled "Heart" in 2012, and the 58th, titled "On My Way," as one of Rachel's dads (LeRoy) along with Jeff Goldblum.

He also played a recurring role on the USA Network series Mr. Robot as Scott Knowles, CTO of E Corp. The series began in June 2015 and ended in December 2019.

He has also done voice-overs for animation including Animaniacs, Capitol Critters, Tiny Toon Adventures, A Pup Named Scooby-Doo, The Further Adventures of SuperTed, Kid 'n Play, New Kids on the Block, Scooby-Doo! and the Reluctant Werewolf, Gravedale High, Potsworth & Co., Captain Planet and the Planeteers, The Tom and Jerry Kids Show, Yo Yogi!, Fantastic Max, Pound Puppies, The Addams Family, California Raisins, The Angry Beavers, James Bond Jr., Batman: The Animated Series, Paddington Bear, Pinky and the Brain, Defenders of Dynatron City, The Hot Rod Dogs and Cool Car Cats, Droopy, Master Detective, Denver, the Last Dinosaur, Mighty Max, Don Coyote & Sancho Panda, Vampirina, and the two Flintstones animated movies Hollyrock-a-Bye Baby and I Yabba-Dabba Do!.

Mitchell plays Nicholas Prophet in Wolverine: The Long Night, a scripted podcast serial.

Personal life
He has been married to actress Allyson Tucker since 1994 and has a son, Ellington.

Filmography

Film

Television

Video games

Theatre

Discography

 Brian Stokes Mitchell (June 6, 2006)
Track listing
"Something's Coming" (West Side Story)
"The Best Is Yet to Come" (Cy Coleman)
"Pretty Women" (Sweeney Todd)
"Just In Time" (Bells are Ringing)
"Lazy Afternoon" (The Golden Apple)
"Another Hundred People" (Company)/"Take the 'A' Train"
"How Long Has This Been Going On?" (Funny Face)
"Life is Sweet" (Wonderful Town)
"Losing My Mind" (Follies)
"Being Alive" (Company)
"How Glory Goes" (Floyd Collins)
"Grateful"

 Simply Broadway (2012)
 Plays With Music (2019)

Awards and nominations
Sources: Playbill BroadwayWorld

Honors
2004 - Mitchell was elected the Chairman of the Board of the Actors Fund of America
2016 - Mitchell received the Isabelle Stevenson Award "for his commitment to supporting members of the entertainment community in crisis or transition through his work with The Actors Fund."

References

External links
 
 
 
 

1957 births
Living people
African-American male actors
20th-century African-American male singers
American baritones
American male film actors
American male musical theatre actors
American male television actors
American male voice actors
Tony Award winners
Male actors from Seattle
20th-century American male actors
21st-century American male actors
21st-century African-American people